The Novo River is a river of Rondônia state in western Brazil, a tributary of the Pacaás Novos River.

The river forms the northern boundary of the  Traçadal Biological Reserve, a strictly protected area that was created in 1990.

See also
List of rivers of Rondônia

References

Brazilian Ministry of Transport

Rivers of Rondônia